Live in London is a live concert video by Canadian rock band April Wine, filmed at the Hammersmith Odeon in London, England, on January 27, 1981. This video was first released in 1981 on VHS and BETA format by Thorn EMI, and also on Pioneer Laserdisc in co-operation with Capitol Records and Aquarius Records, Canada. Live in London was also officially release on DVD by Cherry Red Records, on May 13, 2008.

The Live in London video showcases April Wine in concert at the peak of their career, with a full stage, lighting, and pyrotechnics show.

Track listing
All tracks written by Myles Goodwyn unless otherwise noted.
 "Big City Girls"
 "Crash and Burn"
 "Tellin’ Me Lies"
 "Future Tense"
 "Ladies Man"
 "Caught in the Crossfire"
 "Sign of the Gypsy Queen" (Lorence Hud)
 "Just Between You and Me"
 "Bad Boys"
 "One More Time"
 "21st Century Schizoid Man" (R. Fripp, M. Giles, G. Lake, I. McDonald, P. Sinfield)
 "Roller"
 "I Like to Rock"
 "All Over Town"
 "Wanna Rock"

Track listing (Laserdisc version)
All tracks written by Myles Goodwyn unless otherwise noted.
 "Big City Girls"
 "Crash and Burn"
 "Tellin’ Me Lies"
 "Future Tense"
 "Ladies Man"
 "Sign of the Gypsy Queen" (Lorence Hud)
 "Just Between You and Me"
 "Bad Boys"
 "One More Time"
 "Roller"
 "I Like to Rock"
 "All Over Town"
 "Wanna Rock"

Personnel
 Myles Goodwyn – vocals, guitars
 Brian Greenway – vocals, guitars
 Gary Moffet – guitars, background vocals
 Steve Lang – bass, background vocals
 Jerry Mercer – drums
 Directed by – Derek Burbidge 
 Audio mix by – Myles Goodwyn and Mike Stone for Aquarius Records

References

April Wine video albums
1981 video albums
Live video albums
1981 live albums
Concert films
Albums produced by Myles Goodwyn
Albums produced by Mike Stone (record producer)